West Atherton or Atherton is an unincorporated community in southwestern Florida Township, Parke County, in the U.S. state of Indiana.

History
A post office called Atherton was established in 1872, and remained in operation until 1881. The community lies west of Atherton, Indiana, hence the name.

Geography

References

Unincorporated communities in Indiana
Unincorporated communities in Parke County, Indiana